Gracehill Moravian Church and Cemetery is a historic church and cemetery located southwest of Washington, Iowa, United States. It was added to the National Register of Historic Places in 1977. In 1854 the Provincial Board of the Moravian Church provided the funds to Amos Miksch to buy a substantial amount of property to create a Moravian settlement. Lots of various sizes were sold to colony members. Gracehill was organized in 1866, and the church building was completed the next year.

The cemetery was laid out the same year. The church is a simple rectangular, frame structure that measures . A two-stage bell tower rises over the main entrance. From 1908 until it closed in 1970 Gracehill was the last of Iowa's seven Moravian communities. While the congregation continued until 1970, the last resident minister left in 1932. Graves in the cemetery were originally laid out with men on the north and women on the south. After the 1890s people were buried in family plots.

References

Churches completed in 1867
Moravian Church cemeteries
Moravian churches in the United States
Churches on the National Register of Historic Places in Iowa
Cemeteries on the National Register of Historic Places in Iowa
National Register of Historic Places in Washington County, Iowa
Buildings and structures in Washington County, Iowa